Brzezina  (German Bresina) is a village in the administrative district of Gmina Strzelce Opolskie, within Strzelce County, Opole Voivodeship, in south-western Poland.

References

Brzezina